Piyo (Biyo, Biyue;  (Jing 2015:11)) is a Loloish language of China. The people are ethnic Hani, and the "Bi-Ka" varieties (Biyo, Kaduo, Enu) are traditionally considered dialects of Hani. However, in the classifications of Bradley (2007) and Lama (2012), they are more distinct from Hani than other related languages are. Lama classifies Mpi as closer to Biyo dialect than Kaduo is.

In Mojiang County, the Upper Biyo and Lower Biyo varieties are mutually intelligible (Jing 2015:11).

References

Further reading
Jiang Ying [蒋颖], Cui Xia [崔霞], Qiao Xiang [乔翔]. 2009. A study of Ximoluo [西摩洛语研究]. Beijing: Ethnic Publishing House [民族出版社].
Jing Dian [经典] (2015). A reference grammar of Mojiang Biyo Hani [墨江碧约哈尼语参考语法]. Beijing: China Social Sciences Academy Press [中国社会科学出版社]. 
Zhu Maoyun [朱茂云] (2011). A reference grammar of Mojiang Kaduo [墨江哈尼族卡多话参考语法]. Beijing: China Social Sciences Academy Press [中国社会科学出版社].

Southern Loloish languages
Languages of China
Languages of Laos